Klara Olazabal (born 28 August 1998) is a Spanish slalom canoeist who has competed at the international level since 2013.

She won two silver medals in the C1 team event at the ICF Canoe Slalom World Championships, earning them in 2019 and 2021.

References

External links

Living people
Spanish female canoeists
1998 births
Medalists at the ICF Canoe Slalom World Championships
21st-century Spanish women